William Greene may refer to:

Business figures
William G. Greene (1812–1894), businessman and friend of Abraham Lincoln
William Batchelder Greene (1819–1878), American individualist anarchist and banking reformer
William Cornell Greene (1852–1911), mining magnate
William Greene (economist) (born 1951), American economist

Political and government figures
William atte Greene represented Leicester (UK Parliament constituency)
William Greene (MP for Portsmouth) in 1597, Member of Parliament (MP) for Portsmouth
William Greene (colonial governor) (1695–1758), colonial governor of Rhode Island
William Greene (governor) (1731–1809), governor of state of Rhode Island during American Revolutionary War
William Greene (MP) (1748–1829), Member of Parliament for Dungarvan, 1802–1806
William Greene (lieutenant governor) (1797–1883), Rhode Island lieutenant governor after the Civil War
William S. Greene (1841–1924), U.S. Representative from Massachusetts
William Laury Greene (1849–1899), Nebraska Populist politician
Sir William Graham Greene (1857–1950), English civil servant who served as Permanent Secretary to the Admiralty 
William Pomeroy Crawford Greene (1884–1959), British Member of Parliament for Worcester, 1923–1945
Bill Greene (1930–2002), Democratic member of the California State Assembly and the California State Senate
William G. Greene Jr. (born 1940), member of the Massachusetts House of Representatives

Religious figures
William Greene (Dean of Achonry) (died 1843), Dean of Achonry, 1821–1824
William Greene (Dean of Christ Church Cathedral, Dublin) (1827–1910), Dean of Christ Church, Dublin
William Greene (Dean of Lismore) (died 1930), Dean of Lismore, 1919–1930

Others
William Friese-Greene (1855–1921), portrait photographer and prolific inventor
W. Howard Greene (1895–1956), Hollywood cinematographer specializing in Technicolor
Willie Greene (born 1971), baseball player
William P. Greene Jr., Chief Judge of United States Court of Appeals for Veterans Claims
William Greene (aviator) (1874–1952), American aviation pioneer
William A. Greene (1913–1967), publicist
William Hallett Greene, first black member of the U.S. Signal Corps

See also
William Green (disambiguation)
William Greene Turner (1833–1917), American sculptor